The Westerners is a 1919 American silent Western film directed by Edward Sloman and starring Roy Stewart, Robert McKim and Wilfred Lucas.

Plot

Cast
 Roy Stewart as Cheyenne Harry
 Robert McKim as Michael 'Black Mike' Lafond
 Wilfred Lucas as Jim Buckley
 Mildred Manning as Prue Welch / Molly Lafond
 Mary Jane Irving as Little Molly Welch
 Graham Pettie as Prof. Welch
 Frankie Lee as Dennis, the Kid
 Clark Comstock as Lone Wolf
 Dorothy Hagan as Bismarck Annie

References

Bibliography
 Goble, Alan. The Complete Index to Literary Sources in Film. Walter de Gruyter, 1999.

External links
 

1919 films
1919 Western (genre) films
American black-and-white films
Films directed by Edward Sloman
Films distributed by W. W. Hodkinson Corporation
Pathé Exchange films
Silent American Western (genre) films
1910s English-language films
1910s American films
Films with screenplays by Richard Schayer